The 1973–74 Rugby Football League season was the 79th season of rugby league football.

Season summary

1973-1974 saw two division rugby re-introduced. The Championship playoffs were discontinued and the league leaders were declared the champions. A "Club Championship" was played in place of the playoffs but this was a one-off precursor to what became the end of season Premiership. It was a complicated format that involved sides from both divisions.

On 25 April, David Watkins of Salford scored the last of 929 points (41 tries, 403 goals) in a record run of scoring in 92 consecutive games for one club.

Keith Mumby made his début for Bradford Northern this season as the club's youngest ever player, aged 16. In a match against Doncaster this season he scored 12 goals and a try. He went on to become the club's record appearance holder, playing 576 games.

Salford won their fifth Championship. Oldham, Hull Kingston Rovers, Leigh and Whitehaven were demoted to the Second Division.

The Challenge Cup winners were Warrington who beat Featherstone Rovers 24-9 in the final.

The Player's No.6 Trophy winners were Warrington who beat Rochdale Hornets 24-17 in the final.

The Club Championship was won by Warrington who beat St. Helens 13-12 in the final.

BBC2 Floodlit Trophy winners were Bramley  who beat Widnes 15-7 in the final.

2nd Division Champions were: Bradford Northern, and they York, Keighley and Halifax were promoted to the First Division.

Wigan beat Salford 19–9 to win the Lancashire County Cup, and Leeds beat Wakefield Trinity 7–2 to win the Yorkshire County Cup.

League Tables

Championship

Second Division

Challenge Cup

Warrington defeated Huddersfield, Huyton, Wigan and Dewsbury to reach the final against Featherstone Rovers. Captained by Alex Murphy, Warrington beat Featherstone Rovers 24-9 in the final played at Wembley in front of a crowd of 77,400.

This was Warrington’s fourth Cup Final win in ten Final appearances. Derek Whitehead, Warrington's full-back won the Lance Todd Trophy for man-of-the-match.

League Cup

Kangaroo Tour

From September until December also saw the appearance of the Australian team in England on their 1973 Kangaroo Tour. Other than the three test Ashes series against Great Britain (won 2–1 by Australia), The Kangaroos played matches against club and county representative sides

The 1978 Kangaroos were captain-coached by champion St George Dragons fullback Graeme Langlands who was making his third tour following from 1963–64 and 1967–68

References

1973 in English rugby league
1974 in English rugby league
Northern Rugby Football League seasons